"Promises" is a 1999 song by British rock band Def Leppard from their album Euphoria. It was released as a single later that year and reached number one on the Billboard Hot Mainstream Rock Tracks chart as well as number forty-one on the U.K. Singles Chart.

"Promises" is a staple of the band's live performances. Due to its popularity among fans, Def Leppard has performed the song over five hundred times as of December 2022, making it one of the group's top twenty-five most played pieces.

Overview
The song was also featured on the second discs of their compilations Best of Def Leppard and Rock of Ages: The Definitive Collection, released in 2004 and 2005. A live version is featured on their live album Viva! Hysteria, released in October 2013.

In addition to the CD versions of the single a 7" was released for jukeboxes with "Pour Some Sugar on Me" as the B-Side, It would be the final Def Leppard single released on the 7" 45 RPM format until 2018.

It is also one of the few songs from that period of their career that has been performed live on successive tours other than the one directly supporting its parent album.

Track listing

CD: Bludgeon Riffola - Mercury / 562 136-2 / Part 1 / UK
This is also an Enhanced CD-ROM where the Promises music video is recorded.
 "Promises (The Video)"
 "Back in Your Face"
 Album Snippets

CD: Bludgeon Riffola - Mercury / 562 137-2 / Part 2 / UK
 "Back in Your Face"
 "Promises"
 "Worlds Collide"

CD: Bludgeon Riffola - Mercury / MECD 1012-2 / US
 "Promises"
 "Paper Sun"

7": Bludgeon Riffola - Mercury / 314 562 151-7 / US
 "Promises"
 "Pour Some Sugar On Me"

Other versions
In 2018, singer-songwriter Matt Nathanson included his cover of "Promises" on Pyromattia. The album is composed entirely of Def Leppard covers and features songs from High 'N' Dry, Pyromania, Hysteria, and Euphoria.

Charts

References

Def Leppard songs
1999 singles
Songs written by Robert John "Mutt" Lange
Songs written by Phil Collen
Music videos directed by Wayne Isham
1999 songs